William Joseph Coyne (August 24, 1936 – November 3, 2013) was a Democratic member of the United States House of Representatives from Pennsylvania from 1981 to 2003.

Early life and education
Coyne was born in Pittsburgh, Pennsylvania. He graduated from Central Catholic High School in 1954, and received a B.S. in accounting from Robert Morris College.

He served for two years in the United States Army in 1955–1957. He served as a supply sergeant in Korea. After completing his military service, he set up a private accounting firm.

Political career
From 1970 to 1972 he was member of the Pennsylvania House of Representatives, and a member of the Pittsburgh City Council from 1974 to 1980.

Congress
Coyne was elected to Congress in 1980, succeeding 24-year incumbent William S. Moorhead in a district taking in most of Pittsburgh. He was reelected ten times, never facing serious opposition. He was a longtime member of the United States House Committee on Ways and Means

Retirement and death
In 2002, Coyne's district was combined with the district of Mike Doyle, a somewhat more moderate Democrat. Although the new district contained more of Coyne's territory than Doyle's, Coyne retired to avoid the possibility of two Democratic incumbents facing each other in the primary elections.

Coyne died at the age of 77 on November 3, 2013, two months after falling and sustaining head injuries.

Sources

External links

Voting record at the Washington Post

Congressman William J. Coyne 

1936 births
2013 deaths
20th-century American politicians
21st-century American politicians
Democratic Party members of the Pennsylvania House of Representatives
Businesspeople from Pennsylvania
Politicians from Pittsburgh
Robert Morris University Illinois alumni
Military personnel from Pittsburgh
United States Army soldiers
Democratic Party members of the United States House of Representatives from Pennsylvania
Pittsburgh City Council members
Accidental deaths from falls
Accidental deaths in Pennsylvania
Burials at Calvary Catholic Cemetery (Pittsburgh)
20th-century American businesspeople
Central Catholic High School (Pittsburgh) alumni